Ali Samari (born 7 January 1993) is an Iranian shot putter.  He won a gold medal at the 2017 Asian Championships and placed seventh at the 2018 Asian Games.

International competitions

References

External links

1993 births
Living people
Iranian male shot putters
Asian Games competitors for Iran
Athletes (track and field) at the 2018 Asian Games
Asian Athletics Championships winners
Asian Indoor Athletics Championships winners
Payame Noor University alumni